Prunus emarginata, the bitter cherry or Oregon cherry, is a species of Prunus native to western North America, from British Columbia south to Baja California, and east as far as western Wyoming and New Mexico. It is often found in recently disturbed areas or open woods on nutrient-rich soil.

Description
As a tree west of the Cascade Crest the species commonly reaches 80 to a maximum of over 100 feet tall. The flowers are small,  diameter, with five white petals and numerous hairlike stamens; they are almond-scented, and produced in clusters in spring, and are pollinated by insects. The fruit is a juicy red or purple cherry  diameter, which, as the plant's English name suggests, are bitter. As well as reproducing by seed, it also sends out underground stems which then sprout above the surface to create a thicket.

There are two varieties:
Prunus emarginata var. emarginata. Usually shrubby; young shoots and leaves hairless or only thinly hairy. Most of the species' range.
Prunus emarginata var. mollis (Dougl.) Brew. A larger tree; young shoots and leaves downy. Reddish-brown bark with light horizontal bands resembling water birch. Oregon north to British Columbia, mainly coastal.

Similar species 
Prunus pensylvanica, the pin cherry, is closely related.

Ecology
Mammals, deer and livestock forage on the leaves. The cherries are eaten by some birds (especially cedar waxwing), who in turn distribute the seeds. The seeds have hard shells which can preserve them for decades before being released by fire.

The tree is a larval host to the blinded sphinx, elegant sphinx, Lorquin's admiral, pale tiger swallowtail, small-eyed sphinx, spring azure, twin-spotted sphinx, and western tiger swallowtail.

Cultivation
It has hybridized with the introduced European Prunus avium in the Puget Sound area; the hybrid has been named Prunus × pugetensis. It is intermediate between the parent species, but is nearly sterile, producing almost no cherries.

Uses 
The extremely bitter cherries are inedible to humans. Native Americans used the bark in basket making.

Medicinal
Native tribes, most notably Kwakwaka'wakw, used parts of the plant for medicinal purposes, such as poultices and bark infusions. The isoflavone prunetin was isolated for the first time by Finnemore in 1910 from the bark of P. emarginata.

References

External links

 

emarginata
Cherries
Flora of the Western United States
Flora of Baja California
Flora of British Columbia
Natural history of the California chaparral and woodlands
Natural history of the California Coast Ranges
Natural history of the Peninsular Ranges
Natural history of the San Francisco Bay Area
Plants described in 1832
Natural history of the Santa Monica Mountains
Natural history of the Transverse Ranges
Plants used in traditional Native American medicine
Bird food plants
Garden plants of North America
Drought-tolerant plants